BEST OF SOUNDTRACK [emU] is the second best-of album by Japanese composer Hiroyuki Sawano, released on September 9, 2015 on SME Records. It was released in two versions: The Standard edition, which included two CD's with some of his most-known works from anime and TV drama series, and the limited edition, which included an extra disc with re-arrangements of his songs.

It was released on the same day as o1, his first album as SawanoHiroyuki[nZk].

Track listing

Personnel 
Adapted from Booklet

 Hiroyuki Sawano – composer, arranger, producer
 Yasushi Horiguchi – co-producer, executive producer, director
 Daisuke Katsurada – executive producer
 Mitsunori Aizawa - recording engineer, mixing engineer
 Yoshio Ohira – recording engineer, mixing engineer
 Junichiro "ojjy" Ojima – recording engineer, mixing engineer
 Yoichiro Kano – recording engineer, mixing engineer
 Eiichi Nishizaawa – recording engineer, mixing engineer
 Yuji Chinone – mastering engineer
 Shoji Kobayashi – score copy
 Akiko Shimodoi – management staff
 Hajime Sakai – management staff
 Giottographica – art direction & design
 Michito Goto – photographer
 Aya Murakami – hair & make-up
 Tatsuhiko Marumoto – styling
 Yuko Mori – products coordination
 Toru Takeuchi – a&r
 Takeshi Tomaru – a&r
 Harumi Okuma – a&r assistant
 SME Records Promotion Room – media promotion
 Yu Tsuzuki – sales promotion
 Mitsuki Hirabayashi – digital promotion
 Fumiko Yano – business affairs
 Keiichi Tonomura – supervise

References 

2016 compilation albums
Hiroyuki Sawano albums